William Harrison  (born 1872) was an Irish born Welsh international footballer. He was part of the Wales national football team between 1899 and 1901, playing 5 matches. He played his first match on 20 March 1899 against England and his last match on 23  March 1901 against Ireland. At club level, he played for Wrexham. He was the publican of The Turf, the pub which still adjoins Wrexham AFC’s Racecourse ground. The Turf being (then but no longer) a country inn, its grounds were used to make the pitch of the Racecourse, and until recently the balcony of The Turf looked over it.

See also
 List of Wales international footballers (alphabetical)

References

1872 births
Welsh footballers
Wales international footballers
Wrexham A.F.C. players
Place of birth missing
Date of death missing
Association footballers not categorized by position